André Villeneuve is a Canadian politician. Villeneuve was elected to represent the riding of Berthier in the National Assembly of Quebec in the 2008 provincial election. He is a member of the Parti Québécois.

Villeneuve attended the CEGEP de Maisonneuve and followed courses in humanities, police courses, American history and contemporary international problems as well as course in administration at CEGEP L'Assomption. From 1980 to 1989 he would work in the fields of sales, home improvement, renovation and landscaping before becoming a business chief for a concrete firm after 1989.

In municipal and regional politics, Villeneuve was elected the mayor of Lanoraie was also a prefect for the D'Autray Regional County Municipality. He was also a member of the executive council for the Conseil régional de transport de Lanaudière and Conférence régionale des élus de Lanaudière.

Villeneuve defeated the ADQ's Francois Benjamin in the 2008 provincial elections.

References

External links
Official website

Living people
Parti Québécois MNAs
Mayors of places in Quebec
French Quebecers
1961 births
21st-century Canadian politicians